Sulistrowice may refer to the following places in Poland:
Sulistrowice, Lower Silesian Voivodeship (south-west Poland)
Sulistrowice, Masovian Voivodeship (east-central Poland)